Richard Frederick Remer (June 21, 1883 – July 18, 1973) was an American athlete who competed mainly in the 3 kilometre walk. Early in his athletic career, he competed as a member of the Irish American Athletic Club.

He competed for the United States in the 1920 Summer Olympics held in Antwerp, Belgium in the 3 kilometre walk where he won the bronze medal.

He was born in Brooklyn, New York and died in Fort Lauderdale, Florida.

References

External links
Winged Fist Organization

1883 births
1973 deaths
Sportspeople from Brooklyn
Track and field athletes from New York City
American male racewalkers
Olympic bronze medalists for the United States in track and field
Athletes (track and field) at the 1920 Summer Olympics
Medalists at the 1920 Summer Olympics